Mariana Gertum Becker (born 1971) is a Brazilian sports journalist and television reporter for Rede Bandeirantes. Since being employed by Rede Globo in 1995, she has covered association football, extreme sports, water sports, the World Surf League, Formula One motor racing, the Sertões International Rally, and the 2016 Summer Olympics in Rio de Janeiro over the course of her career. In 2021, she stopped working for Rede Globo and started working for Rede Bandeirantes.

Biography
Becker was born in 1971 in Porto Alegre. She is the daughter of a gynecologist and an English literature graduate, and is one of five children in her family. All five children were given equal treatment from their father. Becker began attending surfing championships from age 15, doing radio bulletins on the sport, and was about the age of 17 when she began writing articles on women she found to be interesting. In 1989, she enrolled at the Faulty of Social Communication of the Pontifical Catholic University of Rio Grande do Sul. Becker studied Sociology for half a year and attended radio journalism and semiotic classes. She wrote an article about surfer champion Andrea Lopes, which was published in the Folha de S.Paulo newspaper. In 1994, Becker graduated from the university due to her remaining her for one more semester to complete the Course Completion Work on invasion of privacy and breakable and unbreakable barriers for journalists. During the course, she worked at Jornal Vertical,  and Zero Hora.

In 1995, Becker travelled to Rio de Janeiro to take up employment with Rede Globo television network as a reporter at a time when women were scarce in the sport newsroom departments of Brazil in an environment populated 95 per cent of the time by men. She found the environment to be unwelcoming, but went on to cover association football, extreme sports and water sports for Rede Globo as well as the World Surf League in the islands of Hawaii and Tahiti in 2003 and 2004. In 2007, Becker began to cover Formula One motor racing for Rede Globo as a presenter. She also reported at the Sertões International Rally in 2009, which broadened her knowledge of motor racing. Becker was a reporter at the 2016 Summer Olympics in Rio de Janeiro. She is also called out to breaking news stories by Rede Globo when required. Following the postponement of the 2020 Formula One World Championship by motorsport's world governing body, the Fédération Internationale de l'Automobile, for three months due to the COVID-19 pandemic, she travelled to the five of the season's rounds by car and not by air travel to avoid spending a plethora of time indoors.

Personal life and approach
She lives in Monaco with producer Jayme Brito, whom she married in 2009. Becker is fluent in four languages, something she demonstrated during Rede Globo's broadcast of the 2020 Tuscan Grand Prix, adores animals, and prefers to digest healthy foods. She says she rises early in order to venture to the race circuit as preparation for the network's broadcast of a Grand Prix and continues to work in the immediate area until late at night.

References

External links
 

1970s births
Living people
People from Porto Alegre
Pontifical Catholic University of Rio Grande do Sul alumni
20th-century Brazilian women
21st-century Brazilian women
Women sports journalists
Brazilian women journalists
Brazilian sports journalists
Brazilian women television presenters
Brazilian television presenters
Surfing mass media
Formula One journalists and reporters